Jet is the European brand of filling stations which is owned by American-based conglomerate Phillips 66. 

Jet filling stations are located in Austria, Germany and the United Kingdom, and formerly in Denmark, Sweden and Ireland. The owner sold, in 2006, its stations in Belgium, the Czech Republic, Finland, Hungary, Poland and Slovakia to its Russian affiliate, Lukoil.

History 
Jet Petroleum was formed in Yorkshire in 1954 by Canadian-born Bill Roberts. Conoco acquired Jet in 1961.

The Jet service station network in Ireland was acquired by Statoil in 1996. Maxol acquired 50 Jet/Statoil-branded sites as a condition of the acquisition.

Parent company Conoco merged with Phillips Petroleum in 2002 to form ConocoPhillips.

In September 2007, Statoil also acquired all Nordic stations; however, they continued to use the Jet brand name until 2014 when the Nordic stations were rebranded to the new brand name Ingo.

ConocoPhillips spun off downstream assets to form Phillips 66, which included the Jet service station brand.

References

External links
 
 

Automotive fuel retailers
Phillips 66
Filling stations in the United Kingdom
British subsidiaries of foreign companies